Marcus Valerius Probus, also known as M. Valerius Probus Berytius or Probus the Berytian (c. 20/30 – 105 AD), was a Roman grammarian and critic, who flourished during Nero's reign.

He was a student rather than a teacher, and devoted himself to the criticism and elucidation of the texts of classical authors (especially the most important Roman poets) by means of marginal notes or by signs, after the manner of the Alexandrine grammarians. In this way he treated Horace, Lucretius, Terence and Persius, the biography of the last-named being probably taken from Probus's introduction to his edition of the poet. With the exception of these texts, he published little, but his lectures were preserved in the notes taken by his pupils. Some of his criticisms on Virgil may be preserved in the commentary on the Bucolics and Georgics which goes under his name. We possess by him part of a treatise De notis, probably an excerpt from a larger work. It contains a list of abbreviations used in official and historical writings (especially proper names), in laws, legal pleadings and edicts.

The following works have been wrongly attributed to him.
Catholica Probi, on the declension of nouns, the conjugation of verbs, and the rhythmic endings of sentences. This is now generally regarded as the work of the grammarian Marius Plotius Sacerdos (3rd century).
Instituta artium, on the eight parts of speech, also called Ars vaticana from its having been found in a Vatican manuscript. As mention is made in it of the Baths of Diocletian, it cannot be earlier than the 4th century. It is possibly by a later Probus, whose existence is, however, problematical.
Appendix Probi, treating of the noun, the use of cases, rules of orthography (valuable in reference to the pronunciation of Latin at the time), and a table of Differentiae. As the author has evidently used the Institute, it also must be assigned to a late date.
De nomine excerpta, a compilation from various grammatical works.
De ultimis syllabis ad Caelestinum, a work explaining the quantities and other features of word-endings in the Latin language.

See also
 1st century in Lebanon

References

External links
Corpus Grammaticorum Latinorum: complete texts and full bibliography
In Vergilii bucolica et georgica commentarius, accedunt scholiorum veronensium et aspri quaestionum vergilianarum fragmenta, Henricus Keil (ed.), Halis sumptibus Eduardi Anton, 1848.

Grammarians of Latin
Silver Age Latin writers
1st-century births
105 deaths
1st-century Romans
2nd-century Romans
1st-century writers
2nd-century writers
Valerii
Lebanon in the Roman era